All That We Do is the sixth studio album by hip hop group Jungle Brothers. It was released in 2002. It was released in Germany as "You In My Hut Now" with track listing changes.

Track listing
“Booty Trap”
“Candy”
“Let Me”
“You In My Hut Now”
“All That We Do” (intro)
“All That We Do”
“Love & Hate”
“Something About Cha”
“Let’s Get Away”
“Do Your Thing”
“Buggin”
“What’s the Five O”

References

Jungle Brothers albums
2002 albums